Boyce Avenue is an American cover band formed in Sarasota, Florida, by brothers Alejandro Luis Manzano, Daniel Enrique Manzano, and Fabian Rafael Manzano. The three brothers attended Pine View School in Osprey, Florida. The band is named after a combination of two streets the brothers lived on as children. As of August 9, 2011, they are no longer signed to Universal Republic Records and have started their own independent record label called 3 Peace Records. Boyce Avenue releases original music as well as covers of contemporary and classic songs on YouTube. They have also collaborated with other YouTube artists such as Hannah Trigwell, Kina Grannis, Tiffany Alvord, Megan Nicole, Alex Goot, Megan and Liz, David Choi, Tyler Ward, Savannah Outen, DeStorm Power and The X Factor season two finalists Fifth Harmony, Bea Miller, Diamond White, Carly Rose Sonenclar, actress Sarah Hyland, and Connie Talbot.

Boyce Avenue frequently tours in the United States, Canada, Europe, Australia, and Southeast Asia.

Biography

Daniel was born on October 4, 1980, Fabian was born on July 1, 1984, and Alejandro was born on October 4, 1986. The three attended Pine View High School; Fabian and Daniel played basketball, while Alejandro sang in the choir and was named Mr. Pine View.

The brothers first came together as a band in 2004 when Alejandro (lead vocals, guitar, piano), Fabian (guitar, vocals), and their older brother Daniel (bass, percussion, vocals) reconnected after pursuing their respective educational goals. While music was always a part of their lives and ultimately their collective goal, pursuing a higher education was also important to the brothers. After graduating from Harvard Law School, Daniel moved back to Florida, to join his brothers Fabian and Alejandro, who were both attending classes at the University of Florida. The brothers continued to write music and to perform local shows in Florida, and took formative steps toward becoming a band. In 2007, in an effort to share their music and ideas with the world, the band decided to start filming and posting videos on YouTube of their original songs and covers of songs by other artists. Some of the first few videos they posted included acoustic versions of songs such as Justin Timberlake's "LoveStoned", Rihanna's "Umbrella", and Coldplay's "Viva la Vida", among others. To date, the band has over 5 billion views on YouTube and over 16 million subscribers to their channel.

The band booked a stand-alone show in New York City in January 2009, for their first ever performance in the city, with the show selling out and receiving positive reviews. Since then, the band has toured the world over with similar results. In early 2009, the band performed for an estimated total of 25,000 fans over four headline shows in the Philippines. Following this, the band launched headline tours in the US, Canada, and Europe. Their tour in Summer/Fall of 2011 saw the band playing headline shows in Indonesia, Australia, the US, Canada, and Europe, and playing in iconic rooms throughout the world, such as the Fillmore in San Francisco, Webster Hall in New York, the Riviera Theatre in Chicago, the Sound Academy in Toronto, Shepherd's Bush in London, The Olympia Theatre in Dublin, and Live Music Hall in Cologne.

The band recorded original music for their full-length debut album, All We Have Left, over their first years as an ensemble, and it was released in 2010 through their own label, 3 Peace Records. The lead singles from the album were "Every Breath", "On My Way", and "Broken Angel". The music video for "Every Breath", the first single from the album, was directed by Zach Merch (Blue October, Safetysuit) in Los Angeles, and was a collaborative effort that grew from a treatment written by the band. All We Have Left was entirely written, funded, and produced by the band.

Career

2004–2009: Formation and debut album
Boyce Avenue formed in 2004 when Daniel moved back to Florida after graduating from Harvard Law School. Alejandro and Fabian were both attending classes at the University of Florida but left before graduating. 

In 2007, Boyce Avenue began posting videos of original music and covers of popular songs on YouTube. Many of these covers have over 10 million views and have been released as digital EPs by 3 Peace Records. Their two YouTube channels, BoyceAvenue and BoyceAvenueExtras, have had a total of over 1 billion views as of 2014. While producing the videos for YouTube, Boyce Avenue continued to create original material for their album, All You're Meant to Be, which was released on March 3, 2008. In January 2009, the band performed a stand-alone sold-out show in New York City at the Mercury Lounge. On October 2, 2009 WWE featured their single "Hear Me Now" in a video tribute to Eddie Guerrero on their decade of SmackDown show.

With their sights set on connecting with their online fan base, the band turned their attention to touring, playing four headlining shows in the Philippines. Shortly following this, the band began its first tour of the US.

2010–2011: Signed to Universal Republic
In early 2010, they returned to the Philippines to play festivals with Kris Allen and the Jabbawockeez. This was followed by a spring revisit tour of Europe in 2010.

On January 23, 2010, the band signed with Universal Republic and had a debut album, entitled All We Have Left, released on June 15, 2010. The album was produced and financed entirely by Boyce Avenue prior to being signed to Universal Republic. The album contains reworked songs from All You're Meant to Be and new songs written for the album. The album's first single, "Every Breath", was released digitally on March 16, 2010. The music video for "Every Breath" was released on March 20, 2010.

In November 2011, they released their original music video, "Dare to Believe". In December 2011 they received one million subscribers on YouTube and thanked the subscribers by posting the official music video of "Find Me", from their album All We Have Left. On April 16, 2012, Boyce Avenue released the official video for their song "Broken Angel" as a worldwide debut through Q Magazine and YouTube. The most currently released music video was "On My Way" on November 18, 2012.

2011–present: 3 Peace Records
As of August 9, 2011, Boyce Avenue are no longer signed with Universal Republic and produce their CDs through their own label, 3 Peace Records. The label has since signed artist Hannah Trigwell.

In 2012, Boyce Avenue worked on the American version of The X Factor as vocal coaches.

On May 14, 2013, Boyce Avenue announced a World Tour in the fall. The first four countries they visited were Canada, the US, the UK and Ireland.

By the end of August 2013, Boyce Avenue had hit 1 billion views and 4 million subscribers on YouTube, making them the fourth most popular band on that medium.

On August 6, 2013, they released their first live album, from their world tour, called Live in Los Angeles.

In March 2014, they performed for the first time in Spain, with both concerts in Madrid and Barcelona selling out.

The band's EP, No Limits, was released April 22, 2014, with a full-length album originally planned for later in the year. The EP contains more upbeat pop tracks than their previous work. On March 24, Boyce Avenue announced they will be teaming up with Vessel, a subscription video service launched by the early team behind Hulu, including former CEO Jason Kilar.

Touring
Boyce Avenue's first headline tour was in 2009. As of May 2012, Boyce Avenue has headlined 6 tours in Great Britain and Ireland, 6 tours in continental Europe, 4 tours in the US, 3 tours in Canada, 1 tour in Australia, and have played several shows in Southeast Asia. In August 2010, Boyce Avenue performed with the Goo Goo Dolls and Switchfoot. In November 2011, the band sold out almost every single show on its European tour, including sell outs at Shepherd's Bush Empire in London, the Olympia Theatre in Dublin (the band's second time selling out that venue in its career), and the Live Music Hall in Cologne, Germany. The band's past opening acts have included Ryan Cabrera, Secondhand Serenade, Tyler Hilton, and several YouTube friends of the band's. During this tour, the Band opened the European MTV Video Awards show by appearing in front of over 20,000 fans in a square in Belfast, Northern Ireland where their performance was very well received.

Zayn Malik and Louis Tomlinson of One Direction are fans of Boyce Avenue and in January 2012, Boyce Avenue opened for their friends One Direction during their debut "Up All Night Tour" in Great Britain & Ireland.

Beginning in June 2012, Boyce Avenue performed in its biggest headline tour to date, including stops at the Hammersmith Apollo in London, the Waterfront in Belfast, the Turbinenhalle Oberhausen, Stadtpark in Hamburg, several O2 Academy main halls throughout Great Britain (These include Leeds, Manchester and Newcastle among others) and 2 shows at the Olympia Theatre in Dublin. During June, the band also played at the Isle of Wight Festival in Great Britain, Parkpop Festival in the Netherlands, and the Rock am Ring and Rock im Park festivals in Germany.

Members
Alejandro Manzano – lead vocals, rhythm guitar, piano 
Fabian Manzano – lead guitar, backing vocals 
Daniel Manzano – bass, percussion, backing vocals 
Former Additional Members
Stephen Hatker - drums, percussion 
Jason Burrows – drums, percussion

Discography

Studio albums

Live albums
 Live in Los Angeles (2013)
 Live at the Royal Albert Hall (2018)

EPs

Singles

Promotional singles

Awards and nominations

References

External links

2004 establishments in Florida
American pop music groups
American pop rock music groups
Alternative rock groups from Florida
Musical groups established in 2004
Culture of Sarasota, Florida
American musicians of Puerto Rican descent
American musical trios
Sibling musical trios
Brothers